Viva La Vega is a Live DVD featuring the Norwegian alternative rock band Kaizers Orchestra produced by the Norwegian company Amazon Film. It features their concert at Vega in Copenhagen, Denmark on 6 October 2005, as well as documentaries, music videos, a biography, and stills. The DVD features all the songs Kaizers recorded in 2005, whether as part of the concert itself or as background music for the extras.

DVD Material

Live at Vega
(by Chapter)

 KGB
 Delikatessen
 Knekker deg til sist
 Hevnervals
 Container
 Señor Flamingos adieu
 Blitzregn baby
 Bøn fra helvete
 Mann mot mann
 Kontroll på kontinentet
 Christiania
 På ditt skift
 Dr. Mowinckel
 Di grind
 Dieter Meyers Inst.
 Evig pint
 Ompa til du dør
 Maestro
 Mr. Kaizer, hans Constanze og meg
 Sigøynerblod
 Bak et halleluja
 Resistansen
 170
 Die Polizei

Extras
 Maestro: Making of the Album
 Tour Tull: Socks, Suits, & Rock ’n’ Roll
 Prekestolen/Pulpit Rock: February 2005, Behind the Scenes
 Biography
 Stills and slides

Music Videos
 Maestro
 Knekker deg til sist
 Evig pint
 Kontroll på kontinentet

Navigation
The main menu of the DVD is set up with symbols along the objects around the pump organ Mr. Omen Kaizer is playing.

The !—helmet; The concert at Vega
The Treble Clef—music sheets; Chapter selection
The Star—movie projector; Music videos
Heart symbol—candles/gun; Something very random; click for yourself...
Crowbars—side of the pump organ; Extras section
Three circles—dials on the pump organ; Subtitles selection for the Making of Maestro and Prekestolen documentaries (Norwegian, English, German)
Music Notes—along the keys of the pump organ; Sound selection (Dolby Digital 2.0 and 5.1)

2005 live albums
2005 video albums
Live video albums
Kaizers Orchestra albums